Acianthera cerberus is a species of orchid plant native to Bolivia.

References 

cerberus
Flora of Bolivia